Ryan Jackson may refer to:

Ryan Jackson (Australian footballer) (born 1987), Australian rules football player
Ryan Jackson (English footballer) (born 1990), English association football player
Ryan Jackson (baseball, born 1971), former baseball first baseman
Ryan Jackson (baseball, born 1988), baseball shortstop